The 1938 Little All-America college football team is composed of college football players from small colleges and universities who were selected by the Associated Press (AP) as the best players at each position. For 1938, the AP selected both a first team and a second team.

First team
B - Ted Panish, Bradley Tech
B - Darrell Tully, East Texas Teachers
B - Samuel Roeder, Franklin & Marshall
B - Gaylon Smith, Southwestern (TN)
E - Lloyd Thomas, San Jose State
E - Kenneth Moore, Roanoke
T - George Somers, La Salle
T - Myron Claxton, Whittier
G - Robert Sutton, Chattanooga
G - Dan Buckovitch, Toledo
C - John Horton, Morehead

Second team
B - Sammy Padjen, Dickinson
B - Bobby Kientz, Pacific
B - Ev Elkins, Marshall
B - Hal Brill, Wichita
E - George Abbott, Willamette
E - Ehrwald Stromquist, Abilene Christian 
T - Frank Crisci, Western Reserve
T - Pete Gudauskas, Murray State
T - Leo Gruszkowski, Centre
C - John Duich, San Diego State

See also
 1938 College Football All-America Team

References

Little All-America college football team
Little All-America college football teams